Bodil Russ (16 September 1908 – 31 October 1998) was a Norwegian equestrian. She was born in Vetre Aker. She competed in equestrian at the 1956 Summer Olympics in Stockholm, where she placed 29th in individual mixed dressage, and seventh in the team competition (along with Else Christophersen and Anne-Lise Kielland).

References

External links

1908 births
1998 deaths
Sportspeople from Oslo
Norwegian female equestrians
Norwegian dressage riders
Equestrians at the 1956 Summer Olympics
Olympic equestrians of Norway